Mazhar Kaleem's Imran Series is a series of Urdu spy novels written by Pakistani author Mazhar Kaleem within the classic Imran Series mythos created by famous Pakistani writer Ibn-e-Safi.

According to available record Kaleem first "Imran Series" novel was Maka Zonga which was published by the name of "N Safi" in which he first introduced the character of Captain Shakeel, who was transferred from Military Intelligence. It was published in the late 1960s or early 1970s. Later on (approx. during 1973 to 1975) "Jamal Publisher Bohar Gate Multan" published his first novel on his Pen name "Mazhar Kaleem". Each book in the series was a complete novel but some stories spanned over two or more books (for instance, Kaghzi Qayamat, Imran Ka Aghwa and others).
 
The character of Ali Imran is a playful yet deceiving personality. He is a bright young Oxford graduate with M.Sc. and Ph.D. degrees in chemistry.  His comical and apparently incompetent persona hides his identity as head of a secret service. The Imran Series explains the workings of a country's Secret Service that operates from the capital of an imaginary country called Pakasia. Some other writers of Imran Series used the name of "Pakasia" in that era (1974-1975) like Shaheen Choudhary novel published 1974 or 1975 approximately, one of his novel name was "Pakasia ki Tabahi" later on Mazhar Kaleem also used "Pakasia" in his novels. The Secret Service is administered by the Secretary of Foreign Affairs, Sir Sultan, who offers Imran the position as the Secret Service's head after getting personal help from him.

These novels are currently published by "Yousuf Brothers", from Multan.

Characters created by Mazhar Kaleem

Mazhar Kaleem acquired fame through writing about Ibn-e-Safi's famous character in the Imran Series in the late 1960s. After Ibn-e-Safi many writers tried to write within the Imran series but few have lasted beyond a few novels except Kaleem. He has now written over five hundred novels. He has brought some new characters to the "Imran Series" and wrote various topics like mystic crimes (Misaale Dunya) and economic crimes (Kaghazee Qiyamat).
Imran Series has a range of diverse, colorful, and sentient characters. Few Character created by Mazhar Kaleem are as below:-
 Captain Shakeel 
 Tiger "approximately created in 1980" (In August 1980 another writer Mushtaq Ahmed Qureshi also wrote 13 parts of "Tiger")
 Juanna
 Saliha 
 Natran 
 CHIEF SHAGAL
 Rozi Rascal

List of novels

Books from Yousuf Brothers
This is the complete list of his novels of Imran Series published under the banner of Yousuf Brother from Multan.
 10/7/2017 a
 Sabolate Aager
 Shogi Pama
 Double White
 Kaya Palat
 Shalmaak
 Bagop
 Khamoash Cheikhein
 Calendar Killer
 Ganja Bhikari
 Blue Film
 Ladies Secret Service (Imran Fareedi Series)
 Operation Desert One
 Black Prince
 Doug Rays (Imran Fareedi Series)
 Basashi
 Silver Girl
 Rascal's King
 Aika Baan
 Hara Kari
 Nakabel-e-Taskheer Mujrim Part 1 (Israel mission)
 Mout ka Raqs Part 2 (Israel mission)
 Weather Boss
 Imran Ki Mout
 Zinda Saye
 Black Feather
 Dashing Three
 Rangeen Mout
 Bloody Sandicate
 Dehshat Gard
 Mutaharrik Mout
 Red Medosa
 Danger Land
 Cross Club
 Fohaag International
 Fast Action
 Prince of Dhamp
 Bejurm Mujram
 Blue Eye
 Ankana
 Escape Gray
 Prince Vinchal
 Operation Sandwich Part 2 (Sandwich Plan)
 X-2
 Kaghzi Qiyamat Part 1
 Kaghzi Qiyamat Part 2
 Lady Eagles Part 1
 Lady Eagles Part 2
 Topaz Part 1
 Topaz Part 2 (Yakini Mout)
 Anari Mujrim
 Hi-Fi
 Ghaddar Julia
 Karvan-e-Dehshat Part
 Karvan-e-Dehshat Part
 Jayalay Jasoos Part
 Jayalay Jasoos Part
 Camp Reckers Part 1
 Camp Reckers Part 2
 Wild Tiger
 Pakishia Club
 Adhura Formula Part 1
 Adhura Formula Part 2
 Robin HUD
 Diamond of Death
 Bankay Mujram
 Top Rock Part
 Top Rock Part
 Julia Fight Group Part 1
 Julia Fight Group Part 2
 Power Land Part
 Power Land Part
	 Jauana in Action Part 1
	 Jauana in Action Part 2
	 Star Track Part 1
	 Star Track Part 2
	 Little Devils
	 Face of Death Part1
	 Face of Death Part 2
	 Black Death Part3
	 Black Death Part 4
	 Hot Knot Part1 & Part2
	 Special Agent Brono
	 Red Chief
	 Death Circle
	 Trinch Fire
	 Shooting Power
	 Dark Club
	 Halka Mout Part1
	 Halka Mout Part2
	 Way To Action Part1
	 Way To Action Part2
	 Top Target
	 Lancer Five Part1 & Part2
	 Agent from Power Land
	 Road Side Story
	 Great Fight
	 Black Kalaar
	 Wonder Plan Part1 & Part2
	 Death Group
	 Hekal Sulemani Part 1 & Part 2 (Israel mission)
	 Lady Sunderta Part1 & Part2
	 Lady Killers
	 Saajan Center
	 Red Power
	 Power Land Ki Tabahi
	 Juliana Top Action
	 Challenge Mission
	 Pressure Lock
	 One Man Show
	 Ladies Mission Part1 & Part2
	 Foul Play Part1 & Part2
	 Zero over Zero Part1 & Part2
	 Super Agent Safdar Part1 & Part2
	 Blood Hounds
	 Easy Mission
	 Light House
	 Secret Service Mission
	 Four Corners Part1 & Part 2 (Imran Fareedi Series)
	 Silver Hands
	 Adventure Mission
	 Golden Sand Part 1, Golden Sand Part 2
	 Rebite Part1 & Part2
	 Jasoos-e-Azam
	 Red Point
	 Alert Camp Part1 & Part2
	 Tight Plan (Israel mission)
	 Dashing Agent Part1, Dashing Agent Part2
	 Inventory Grip Part1
	 Inventory Grip Part2
	 Camp Fight
	 Birth Stone
	 Wood King
	 Top Rise
	 Supreme Fighter
	 Nawashingu
	 Water Power Part1
	 Water Power Part2 (Great Ball)
	 Water Power Part3 (Great Victory)
	 Water Power Part4 (Black Pagos)
	 Dogo Fighters Part1 & Part2
	 Sacret Heart
	 True Man
	 Action Group Part1 & Part2
	 Barki
	 Well Done
	 Special Plan
	 Desert Commandos
	 Blood Rays Part1
	 Blood Rays Part2
	 Heli Kat
	 Kareka
	 Red Dot
	 Logasa Mission
	 Last Fight Part1 & Part2
	 Flaster Project Part1 & Part2
	 Night Fighters
	 Karosho
	 Hard Mission Part1 & Part2
	 Hollow Wall Part1 & Part2
	 Sarto Mission Part Sarto Mission Part
	 Super Mind Agent Part1 & Part2 (Black Thunder Series)
	 Zarak
	 Bright Stone
	 Zero Lastri Part1 & Part2 (Mysticism Series)
	 Texaat Part Texaat Part
	 Jim Might
        Long Fight Part1 & Part2
        Big Boss Part1 & Part2
        Boganu Part
	 Boganu Part
	 Last Round
	 Third Force Part1 & Part2
	 Fyland Part1 & Part2
	 Black Agents
	 Bloody Game
	 Cross Mission Part1 & Part2
	 S S Project Part1 & Part2 (Mushkbar Mission)
	 Destruction Plan Part1, Destruction Plan Part2
	 Black Hounds Part1, Black Hounds Part2
	 Super Mission
	 Spot Game
        Hisrat-ul-Arz
	 Black Hills Part1 & Part2
	 Tatar Daggers Part1
	 Snake Circle Part1
	 Black Strip Part1 & Part2
	 Special Ply
	 Hot Field Part1 & Part2
	 Hot Spot Part3 & Part4
	 Hot Fight Part5 & Part6
	 Saqaab Project Part1 & Part2
	 San Kara
	 Misali Duniya (Mysticism Topic)
	 Red Ring
	 Blind Attack Part1 & Part2
	 Open-Close Part 1, Open-Close Part 2
	 Black World Part1 & Part 2 (Mysticism Series)
	 Black Powers Part3 & Part4 (Mysticism Series)
	 Kakana Island Part 1
	 Golden Agent Part1 & Part2 (Black Thunder Series)
	 Golden Agent in Action Part1 & Part2(Black Thunder Series)
	 Four Stars Part 1 & Part 2 (Four Stars Mission)
	 Code Walk Part1 & Part2
	 Blasters
	 Special Section
	 Royal Service Part1 & Part2
	 Ladies Island Part1 & Part2
	 Double Game Part1 & Part2
	 Funk Syndicate Part1 & Part2
	 Fighting Mission Part1 & Part2
	 Dog Crime (Four Stars Mission)
	 Dushman Julia
	 Zigzag Mission Part1 & Part2 (Imran Fareedi Series)
	 Saffaak Mujrim (Four Stars Mission)
	 Red Craft
        Stalks Part1 & Part2
	 Death Quick Part1 & Part2
	 Tower Section Part1 & Part2
	 Long Bird Complex Part1 & Part2 (Israel mission)
	 Long Bird Sealed Complex Part1 & Part2 (Israel mission)
	 Blasting Station Part1 & Part2 (Mushkbari Series)
	 Sasic Center Part1 & Part2
	 Black Crime Part1 & Part2 (Four Stars Series
	 Last Upset Part1 & Part2 (Mushkbari Series)
	 Safli Duniya Part1 & Part 2 (Mysticism Series)
	 Prince Kachan Part1 & Part2
	 Rosy Rascal
	 Rock Head (Four Stars Mission)
	 Imran Ka Aghwa Part1 & Part2
	 Spargo Part1 & Part2
	 Diamond Powder Part1 & Part2
	 Tafreehi Mission Part1 & Part2
	 Treaty Part1 & Part2
	 Green Death Part1 7 Part 2 (Imran Fareedi Series)
	 Power Agent Part1 & Part2
	 Makruh Mujrim part 1 & Part 2 (Four Stars Mission)
	 Dark Mission Part1 & Part2
	 Base Camp Part1 & Part2 (Mushkbar Mission)
	 Zaheen Agent
	 Red Zero Agency
	 J S P Part1 & Part2
	 Jinnati Duniya (Mysticism Series)
	 Death Rays
	 Golden Spot Part1 & Part2
	 Grass Dam Part1 & Part2
	 Black Face Part1 & Part2
	 Double Mission Part1 & Part2
	 Shedog Part1 & Part2
	 Shedog Headquarter Part1 & Part2
	 Red Authority Part1 Part 2 (Israel mission)
	 Lasilky
	 Dark Eye Part1 & Part2
	 Snake Killers
	 Shudarmaan Part1 & Part2 (Mysticism Series)
	 Sea Egale Part1 & Part2
	 Agrosaan
	 Cosmic Star Part1 & Part2
	 Red Army Part1 & Part2
	 Red Army Network Part1 & Part2
	 Red Flag
	 Pearl Pirate
	 Makruh Chehrey (Four Stars Mission)
	 Crown Agency
	 Faban Society Part1 & Part2
	 Last Movement
	 Smart Mission
	 Super Master Group
	 Thread Ball Mission
	 Fort Dam
	 Fayougi Task
	 Hanging Death
	 Villago Part1 & part 2 (Mysticism Series)
	 Black Arrow
	 Jewish Channel (Israel mission)
	 Black Hawks Part1 & part 2 (Israel mission)
	 Power Squad (Israel mission)
	 Electronic Eye
	 Karakoon
	 Special Mission Part1 & Part2
	 Black Mask
	 C Top
	 Water Missile
	 Target Mission
	 Foregion Group
	 Makarno Sandicate
	 Karkis Point
	 Flower Syndicate
	 Taroot Part1 & Part 2 (Mysticism Series)
	 High Victory Part1
	 High Victory Part2 (Final Fight)
	 Starg Part1 & Part2
	 Rodix
	 Partin (Israel mission)
	 Sagaan Mission Part1
	 Sagaan Mission Part2 (X-V File)
	 Sagaan Mission Part3 (Red Top) Sagaan Mission Part (K.G.B. Headquarter)
	 Taaraak Part1 & Part2
	 Double Lock
	 Torson Agency
	 Large View Project Part1 & Part2
	 Soft Mission Part1
	 Soft Mission Part2 (Hard Re-Back)
	 Broad System
	 Muslim Curruncy Part1 & Part2
	 Cat Rat Game Part1 & Part2
	 Suspense Game Part3 & Part4
	 Mamar (Mysticism Topic)
	 Bright Eye
	 Star Mission
	 Last Warning
	 White Shadow
	 S Three
	 Shooter
	 Black Thunder Section Part1 & Part2 (Black Thunder Series)
	 Sawana
	 Cotton Seed
	 Hot Rays
	 Domnaai (Mysticism Topic)
	 Harch
	 Big Challenge Part1 & Part2
	 Great Mission Part1 & Part2
	 Zero Mission
	 Red Circle
	 Mind Blaster Part1 & Part2
	 Crossing Arrow
	 Last Trap
	 Maha Pursh Part1 & Part 2 (Mysticism Series)
	 Kashaam (Mysticism Topic)
	 Mariya Section Part1 & Part2
	 Black Fighters (Israel mission)
	 Mushkbari Code (Mushkbar Mission)
	 Zero Blaster
	 Capital Agency
	 Prince Shama
	 Business Crime(Four Stars Mission)
	 Mission Sagor
	 Gleri Seedia
	 Blue Code Book Part Blue Code Book Part
	 Big Dam
	 Sagraam Mission
	 Dodging Mission
	 Beggers Mafia (Four Stars Mission)
	 Free Socks
	 Chief Agent Part1 & Part2
	 Dark Face Part1 & Part2
 Top Secret Mission
   Black Day

Books from Khan Brothers

Mazhar Kaleem MA has now started his new publication known as '’Khan Brothers'’. In which he publishes his new 'Imran Series. The list of his new books are:
 Rosy Rascal Mission
 Devil's Pearl (Mysticism Series)
 Secret Center
 Blind Mission
 Blue Hawks
 Tiger In Action (Israel mission)
 Saarj Agency
 Saarj Headquarter
 Target Imran
 Black Head
 Winning Party
 Blue Bird Group
 Group Fighting
 Black Scarab (Mysticism Series)
 Hard Crime (Four Stars Mission)
 Hawk Eye
 Danger Group Chow
 Fast Mission
 One To One
 Kaali Duniya (Mysticism Series)
 Special Station
 Jewish Power (Israel mission)
 Multi Mission
 Two in One (Israel mission)
 Golden cross
 Fight plus
 Hot World (Special Number)
 E-City
 Green Guard
 Reverse Circle
 Violent Crime(Four Stars Mission)
 Side Track
 Taghooti Duniya(Mysticism Series)
 Blank Mission
 Golden Colok {Four Stars Mission}
 Cyrus
 Grand Victory
 Twin Sisters
 Action Agency
 Top Mission (Special# Black Thunder Series)
 Crowg (Mysticism Series)
 Peacock
 Casper Rays
 Aarmis Parohit (Mysticism Series)
 Hard Agency
 White Birds (Special Number)
 Red Sky
 Multi Target
 Black Day (Four Stars Mission)
 Great Falls
 Karman Mission
 Black Sun
 Lime Lite
 Sangeen Jurm
 Master Laboratory
 Lords
 Rockfield
 Fugoshay
 Shogran Mission
 Salaaska
 Danger Mission 
 Swodmaga
 Top Shoot
 Hard Target 
 Cobran 
 Marshal Agency
 Code Box
 Tawaan 
 Total Zero
 Super Agents 
 Top Section
 Water Lite
 D Group
 Black Business
 Black Crown
 Top Headquarter
 Shaitan Ke Pujari
 Supreme Force 
 Asadome
 Double Targate
 Top Victory
 kallinga Mission
 Half Mission
 Sporgan
 Double Dodge
 Dark Heart
 Syral
 Scarm
 Final Game
 Special Force
 Master Mission

See also
 Imran Series
 Imran series characters
 Ali Imran

Novel series
Pakistani spy novels